Antwone is an African-American English given name associated with Antoine and Anthony in use in the United States. Notable people with this name include the following people.

Antwone Fisher (born 1959), American director, screenwriter, author, and film producer
Antwone Savage (born 1981), American gridiron football player

See also

Antwon (name)
Antwoine

Notes

African-American given names